Human Revolution may refer to:

 Deus Ex: Human Revolution,  a 2011 video game in the Deus Ex series
 The Human Revolution, a multi-volume novel by Daisaku Ikeda, and adaptations
 The Human Revolution (human origins), the sudden emergence of language, consciousness and culture in our species
 Human evolution (origins of society and culture), the physical emergence of Homo sapiens as a distinct species
 Neolithic Revolution, the wide-scale transition from hunting and gathering to agriculture
 Origins of society, the emergence of distinctively human social organizations